The Chase is a British television quiz show broadcast on ITV and hosted by Bradley Walsh. Contestants play against a professional quizzer, known as the "chaser", who attempts to prevent them from winning a cash prize.

The six chasers are Mark Labbett, Shaun Wallace, Anne Hegerty, Paul Sinha, Jenny Ryan and Darragh Ennis. Labbett and Wallace have both been chasers since Series 1 while Hegerty joined in Series 2, Sinha in Series 4, Ryan in Series 9 and Ennis in Series 13. With rare exceptions for special episodes, only one chaser participates in any given episode.

A team of four contestants individually attempt to amass as much money as possible which is later added to a prize fund if the contestant survives their chase. The chaser must attempt to catch each contestant during their chase, eliminating that person from the game and preventing the money from being added to the collective prize fund. In the individual chase, the player must choose between a higher offer (closer to the chaser), their earned money and a lower offer (further away from the chaser). Later, in the final round, contestants who survived their chases play collectively as a team against the chaser for an equal share of the prize fund.

With a regular audience of three to five million, The Chase is one of the most successful and longest running game shows on UK television and one of ITV's most successful daytime shows ever. The show has been nominated six times at the National Television Awards, winning in 2016, 2017 and 2019. They also won for the spin-off series, Beat The Chasers in 2021 and 2022. It was also nominated for the inaugural Best Daytime award at the 2021 British Academy Television Awards but won it in 2022. Additionally, The Chase has become a successful international franchise: regional versions have been made in Australia, Bulgaria, China, Croatia, Cyprus, Czech Republic, Finland, Germany, Greece, Israel, Norway, Russia, Serbia, Slovakia, Spain, Turkey and the United States. Labbett and Hegerty feature as chasers on the Australian version (with Wallace appearing as a "Guest Chaser" in 2018). Labbett featured as the sole chaser on the 2013–2015 American version and joined the 2021 American version for its second season.

Gameplay

Cash Builder and Head-to-Head rounds
Each contestant individually attempts to accumulate money for the team's prize fund through two rounds. In the first round, known as the "Cash Builder", the contestant answers as many questions as they can within one minute. Each correct answer awards £1,000; there is  no penalty for incorrect answers or passes. After completing the Cash Builder, the contestant enters the "Head-to-Head" round, attempting to move the money down to the bottom of a seven-step board and into the team's prize fund ("home") without being caught by the chaser. The board had eight steps in Series 1.

The contestant is given three options by the Chaser at the start of the Head-to-Head round: play for the money earned in the Cash Builder and start three steps down the board (requiring five correct answers to reach home), accept a higher offer and start two steps down, or accept a lower offer and start four steps down. The lower offer can be zero or even a negative amount if the team has already banked some money. Once the starting position is selected, the host asks a series of multiple-choice questions to the contestant and the Chaser, both of whom individually select one of the three answer options on keypads. After either person locks in a guess, the other must do so within five seconds or be locked out for that turn. A correct answer moves the person who gave it one step down the board while a wrong answer or lock-out leaves them where they are.

If the contestant reaches home without being caught, they advance to the Final Chase and their money is added to the team's prize fund (or deducted, if they took a negative amount). If the chaser catches up, the contestant is eliminated and the money is forfeited. If all four contestants are caught by the chaser, they nominate one contestant to play the Final Chase alone.

Final Chase
The contestants who have won their head-to-head chases blindly select one of two question sets for themselves, with the other set put aside for the Chaser, and then have two minutes to answer as many questions as possible on the buzzer. Any answer given by a contestant who has not buzzed-in is automatically ruled wrong; if only one contestant is participating in this round, the buzzer is not used. Every correct answer moves the team one step ahead of the Chaser, and they are given a head start of one step per contestant participating in this round. The contestants may not discuss or confer on any questions during this portion of the round and may pass as often as desired. There is no time limit on individual questions; the host will only ask a new question after someone has either answered or passed on the current one.

The Chaser is then given two minutes to answer questions from the unused set in an attempt to catch the team, moving one step ahead per correct answer. If the Chaser passes or misses a question, the clock stops and the team is given a chance to discuss it and respond; a correct answer pushes the Chaser back one step or (from series 3 onwards) moves the team ahead one step if the Chaser is at the starting line. If the Chaser catches the team before the time expires, the prize fund is forfeited and the contestants receive nothing. During celebrity editions, a consolation £1,000 is donated to each celebrity's chosen charity in this case.

If the Chaser is unable to catch up to the team, the participating contestants split the prize fund equally. If all four contestants are caught in their head-to-head chases and the one they nominate wins the Final Chase, each contestant wins £1,000 (£2,000 in celebrity specials).

Filming
Three episodes are filmed in a day, each one taking around an hour and a half to film. According to Walsh, "It runs like clockwork." The Final Chase can be stopped and re-started if Walsh stumbles on a question. He told the Radio Times, "If there is a slight misread, I am stopped immediately – bang – by the lawyers. We have the compliance lawyers in the studio all the time. What you have to do is go back to the start of the question, literally on videotape where my mouth opens – or where it's closed from the previous question – and the question is re-asked. It is stopped to the split second."

Between March 2020 and late June 2020, production of the series was suspended due to the coronavirus pandemic; the series was already on a previously scheduled production hiatus at the time of the suspension. In an interview with The Suns TV Mag, Walsh said that the show was "at least 100 episodes behind schedule" due to lockdown; during the production hiatus, repeats were shown in the programme's regular timeslot.

Chasers

Spin-offs

The Chase: Celebrity Special
A spin-off series titled The Chase: Celebrity Special featuring celebrity teams as contestants began airing on ITV in 2011. As many contestants are comedians or actors, there is a much-higher comedic element. The game is played the same way as the regular version. However, if all four celebrities have been caught by the chaser, the prize fund during the Final Chase is £8,000 (originally £4,000). If the team is caught during the Final Chase, a consolation prize of £1,000 is awarded to the charities for each celebrity who advanced to this stage.

For celebrity specials airing at Christmas, the chasers frequently appear in costumes adhering to a common theme, such as Panto villains, subjects of famous paintings, or characters typically associated with Christmas.

The Family Chase
In February 2017, ITV commissioned The Family Chase, a spin-off featuring a team of four family members. The six-episode spin-off debuted on 2 September 2017. The second series of 16 episodes was commissioned and commenced airing on 24 March 2019. This version follows the same rules as the parent programme, but any winnings in the Final Chase are awarded to the entire family rather than individual members.

Beat the Chasers
In November 2019, ITV commissioned another spin-off called Beat the Chasers. It began airing in prime-time on 27 April 2020 and features contestants attempting to beat up to five chasers to win big cash prizes. The chasers that featured in the show were Sinha, Labbett, Ryan, Hegerty and Wallace. A single contestant plays the Cash Builder round, answering a series of multiple-choice questions worth £1,000 each. The round ends once they either miss a question or get five right; a miss on the first question immediately ends the game with no winnings. They must then decide how many chasers from two to five to face in a timed head-to-head round, with the chasers specifying a time limit for themselves (always less than 60 seconds) and offering larger cash prizes as an incentive to face more of them. The offer to face two chasers is always equal to the amount earned in the Cash Builder.

The contestant's clock is set to 60 seconds, while the chasers' clock is set to their agreed-on time. Only one clock runs at any given moment, starting with the contestant; the side in control must answer a question correctly to stop their clock and turn control over to the opposing side. The chasers must buzz-in to respond and may not confer on any questions. The contestant wins the money on offer if the chasers' clock runs out first, or nothing if their own clock runs out.

A second series of Beat the Chasers commenced airing on 3 January 2021, and continued consecutively for seven nights, excluding 9 January, until 10 January 2021. Due to the COVID-19 pandemic, the second series featured no studio audience.

A third series was commissioned by ITV. The network had originally intended to have all six chasers participate in this series; however, these plans had to be postponed as Paul Sinha was absent due to illness. The series began with a celebrity special on 27 March 2021 and once again featured no studio audience.

A fourth series was commissioned by ITV, and premiered on 11 September 2021 with all six chasers participating for the first time. This series introduced a "Super Offer," available only to contestants who answered all five of their Cash Builder questions correctly. This offer was presented in conjunction with the other four and gave the contestant a chance to play against all six chasers at once, with no time advantage and a larger cash prize than that offered for facing five chasers.

A fifth series went into production in March 2022 and premiered on 16 May 2022. Hegerty was absent from this series due to a positive COVID-19 test, and was replaced by guest chaser Issa "The Supernerd" Schultz from The Chase Australia.

The original working title for the spin-off show was Take On the Chasers. The theme tune was composed by Paul Farrer using part of the original 2009 chaser walk-on music.

The Chase Extra
In this special isolation version of the show, broadcast on The Chase's YouTube channel and shown straight after the main show, all five Chasers are presenters and viewers at home can play along, for they are the contestants. Each series has five episodes; the first series was shown in mid-May 2020, and was hosted by Jenny Ryan. Between late-May and early-June, the second series was shown across consecutive days and presented by Shaun Wallace. On 1 March 2021, it was announced that a new series would be available on the ITV Hub for six episodes, every Monday at 6:00 p.m.

The Chasers' Road Trip: Trains, Brains and Automobiles
In November 2020, ITV announced another spin-off in which The Beast, The Dark Destroyer and The Governess go on a road trip around the world. On their travels, they play against child geniuses, great apes, dolphins and robots. The series takes them to the UK, USA and Japan. Episode 1 of the show aired on 21 January 2021, episode 2 aired on 28 January 2021 and episode 3 aired on 4 February 2021. The series was narrated by Rob Brydon.

Transmissions

Regular editions

Celebrity Special editions

The Family Chase editions

EXTRA editions

Beat the Chasers editions

The Chasers Road Trip: Trains, Brains and Automobiles editions

International broadcasts

Australia
Episodes of the British version of The Chase air on weekday afternoons at 3:00pm to good ratings on Seven Network (and sometimes airing double episodes from 2:00pm), placing it in direct competition with rival game shows Millionaire Hot Seat (in Western Australia) and Tipping Point (outside of Western Australia) on the Nine Network. Seven also considered producing a local version, and filmed a pilot episode on the UK set, but decided not to proceed. However, in mid-2015 a local version was commissioned to replace Deal or No Deal and Million Dollar Minute in a bid to revive ratings for its struggling flagship 6:00pm nightly news bulletin. Hegerty and Labbett feature as two of the five permanent chasers on the Australian version, while Wallace appeared as a guest chaser in 2018.

New Zealand
Episodes of the British version of The Chase air on Monday to Saturday afternoons at 5:00pm on TVNZ 1, while The Chase: Celebrity Special airs on Sunday afternoons at 4:55pm, providing the lead-in to the 6:00 pm nightly news. Repeat episodes air on Monday to Friday mornings at 11:00 am. The show frequently ranks in the weekly top-20 most watched TV shows, drawing in an average of 1.3 million viewers per week. , they are currently airing series 14.

Reception

Critical reception

The Chase is highly popular with critics and viewers. Despite early criticism, opinion has improved over time. Some critics, as well as the chasers, put the show's success down to Walsh as host and his many memorable moments, some of which come from questions or answers which often leave him in hysterics. Labbett also said that the sense of fun and the variety of chasers is a major factor. Sinha said, "The format has been brilliantly thought out. No matter the relative strengths of the players, it is resolutely a team game, with a dramatic climax."

Controversies
The Chase has also been criticised on several occasions, such as the Final Chase, when it is alleged that Walsh asks the chasers' questions more quickly than those of the contestants. In an interview with the Radio Times, Walsh repudiated those claims: "We have lawyers on the floor to watch all of this. I read [the questions] at the same speed for both." He went on to say, "Don't forget, if I've got Mark Labbett answering questions for two minutes and I've got a team answering for two minutes, the team aren't going to be quicker. Simple as that, because they have to press the button [before answering], which is why they get a head start based on how many people are in the final. If you've got three people in the final chase that's a three-step head start–that's about a twelve-second advantage."

There have also been a number of games where the chaser has won with an answer right on the final buzzer, which some viewers have perceived to be out of time; spokespeople have asserted that an independent adjudicator – a representative from Beyond Dispute Ltd – always checks each show and makes the final call on whether answers were in or out of time.

On 6 April 2016, on an episode where Labbett was the chaser, a glitch occurred whereby the clock froze at 10 seconds and then increased to 11 seconds, giving Labbett an extra second. Although the contestants were far ahead and there was no chance of their being caught (and would win a £27,000 pot), a spokesperson for the show told OK! Online the following day that an error occurred during the editing process, but gameplay was otherwise not affected by it.

On 4 March 2019, an episode was broadcast where Walsh asked a question about which band had the fewest members – with the possible answers being the Proclaimers, the Pretenders, or the Prodigy. Many viewers criticised ITV for deciding to air the episode hours after the news had publicly broken about the death of the Prodigy's frontman Keith Flint.

On 26 January 2022 Labbett lost the final chase and, after briefly congratulating the winners, stormed off the set punching the wall on his way out. This left Walsh to apologise to the audience stating "I apologise to any kids watching, that is not how you should take defeat." Labbett subsequently apologised for his behaviour via Twitter.

Ratings
During its first two series, the show averaged 1–2 million viewers, then over 2 million during series three. By December 2012, The Chase had become ITV's most popular "teatime" programme since The Paul O'Grady Show in 2005, with over 3 million viewers an episode. In January 2021, The Chase managed a peak audience of over 5 million, an all-time high. Almost every episode is now seen between 4 and 5 million viewers; and each episode regularly features on ITV's Top 15 weekly broadcasts.

Rivalry with Pointless

In its timeslot, The Chase airs at the same time as BBC One's Pointless, a game show launched in August 2009, two months after The Chases debut. The two programmes usually receive similar ratings (for example in September 2012, The Chase had 2.44 million viewers versus 2.27 million for Pointless). However, between October 2012 and January 2013, The Chase beat Pointless in the ratings each week. For two weeks in February 2013, Pointless received a higher share than The Chase (3.53 million viewers to 3.41 million, and again 3.58 million viewers to 3.30 million).

Awards

International versions

The Chase international versions
Legend:  Currently airing    Reinstated and currently airing  No longer airing    Upcoming    New and currently airing

Beat the Chasers international versions
Legend:  Currently airing    No longer airing    Upcoming

Merchandise
A board game based on the show was released in 2012 by Ideal. In 2013, a card game based on the show was released by Ginger Fox.

On 12 December 2012, a version for iOS was released by Barnstorm Games. The app features four chasers (excluding Jenny "The Vixen" Ryan and Darragh "The Menace" Ennis, both of whom had not yet appeared on the programme at the time of release) and can be played by up to four people, as in the actual show. The only differences between the app and the show are that four choices are presented for questions in the Cash Builder and the Final Chase rounds and that no Final Chase is played if all four players are caught in their head-to-head chases. The app is designed for both iPhones and iPads. An updated version, The Chase: Ultimate Edition, was released in 2017 and features five chasers (excluding Ennis) and host Walsh. In 2020, the app is updated with now featuring Ennis.

References

External links

 
 
 Beyond Dispute at www.beyonddispute.co.uk

2009 British television series debuts
2000s British game shows
2010s British game shows
2020s British game shows
Bradley Walsh
English-language television shows
ITV game shows
Television series by ITV Studios
Television shows shot at Elstree Film Studios
Television shows shot at Teddington Studios